The Sint Maarten Amateur Athletic Association is the governing body for the sport of athletics in Sint Maarten.  Current president is Les Brown.

Affiliations 
Leeward Islands Athletics Association (LIAA)
The Sint Maarten Amateur Athletic Association is an observer member federation for Sint Maarten in the
Central American and Caribbean Athletic Confederation (CACAC)
The Sint Maarten Amateur Athletic Association is invited to participate at the 
CARIFTA Games

References 

Sint Maarten
Sports governing bodies in Sint Maarten
Sport in Sint Maarten
National governing bodies for athletics